In the United States a contingent surplus note is a bond-like instrument issued by an insurance company. These securities are subordinated obligations, and fall at the very bottom of the operating insurance company's capital structure. They are issued primarily by mutual insurance companies, which are not public and are owned instead by their policy holders. Surplus notes are debt-like in that they pay a coupon and have a finite maturity. However, in many cases, state insurance regulators have allowed insurance companies to classify the capital raised via surplus notes as “surplus” (which is the statutory equivalent of equity), because surplus note holders are last in line to make a claim on the company's assets in a default scenario, much like where equity holders reside in a public company. The motivation for mutual companies to issue these instruments was to raise surplus (or equity) in response to new risk-based capital guidelines developed in the early 1990s. Because mutual companies are owned by policyholders, not shareholders, there was no alternative method to raise surplus or equity. While surplus note holders have last the claim on the assets of the operating insurance company, it is important to realize that this claim is at the operating company level, which is still ahead of holding company obligations.

Further reading
Laurent Condamin, Jean-Paul Louisot, Patrick Naïm. Risk Quantification: Management, Diagnosis and Hedging John Wiley & Sons, Jan 30, 2007 pg. 229

References

Corporate finance
Interest-bearing instruments